Line Højmark Kjærsfeldt (born 20 April 1994) is a Danish badminton player specializing in singles. She won a bronze medal at the 2010 BWF World Junior Championships in the women's doubles with Sandra-Maria Jensen. Kjærsfeldt also won a gold medal in 2015 European Games.

Career 
Kjærsfeldt began to playing badminton at the age of eight, and started to playing competitively at the age of 15. She competed at the 2010 World Junior Championships and won the bronze medal in the girls' doubles partnered with Sandra-Maria Jensen, after in the semi-finals, they were beaten by the Chinese pair Bao Yixin and Ou Dongni in straight games. Kjærsfeldt won her first international title in the women's doubles at the 2011 Croatian International with Jensen. She then played at the Vantaa European Junior Championships, won the gold medal in the mixed doubles with Kim Astrup and bronze medal in the girls' doubles with Jensen. She entered two finals at the Scottish International, and won her first mixed doubles title with Astrup.

In 2012, Kjærsfeldt won her first title of the year at the Banuinvest International in the women's doubles with Sandra-Maria Jensen. In May, Kjærsfeldt finished runner-up at the Denmark International in the mixed doubles with Kim Astrup. She then won her first women's singles title at the Irish Open. After won the title in Ireland, she then entered the top 100 BWF world ranking.

Kjærsfeldt opened the 2013 season by winning the Estonian International. In March, she clinched the girls' singles silver medal at the European Junior Championships, after being defeated by Bulgarian Stefani Stoeva in the final. In 2014, Kjærsfeldt won the Finnish Open, and also runners-up in the Swedish Masters and Irish Open.

Kjærsfeldt competed at the 2015 Baku European Games and won the gold medal in the women's singles. She then won a Grand Prix title at the Scottish Open beating home favorite Kirsty Gilmour in the final in three games. In 2016, she was defeated by Carolina Marín in the semi-finals of the European Championships, settled for the bronze medal. Kjærsfeldt made her debut at the Olympics in Rio 2016, but her pace was stopped in the group stage. In December, she won her second Irish Open title.

Achievements

European Games 
Women's singles

European Championships 
Women's singles

BWF World Junior Championships 
Girls' doubles

European Junior Championships 
Girls' singles

Girls' doubles

Mixed doubles

BWF World Tour (3 runners-up) 
The BWF World Tour, which was announced on 19 March 2017 and implemented in 2018, is a series of elite badminton tournaments sanctioned by the Badminton World Federation (BWF). The BWF World Tours are divided into levels of World Tour Finals, Super 1000, Super 750, Super 500, Super 300 (part of the HSBC World Tour), and the BWF Tour Super 100.

Women's singles

BWF Grand Prix (1 title, 1 runner-up) 
The BWF Grand Prix had two levels, the Grand Prix and Grand Prix Gold. It was a series of badminton tournaments sanctioned by the Badminton World Federation (BWF) and played between 2007 and 2017.

Women's singles

Mixed doubles

  BWF Grand Prix Gold tournament
  BWF Grand Prix tournament

BWF International Challenge/Series (7 titles, 7 runners-up) 
Women's singles

Women's doubles

Mixed doubles

  BWF International Challenge tournament
  BWF International Series tournament
  BWF Future Series tournament

Invitational tournament 
Women's singles

References 

1994 births
Living people
Sportspeople from Aarhus
Danish female badminton players
Badminton players at the 2016 Summer Olympics
Olympic badminton players of Denmark
Badminton players at the 2015 European Games
Badminton players at the 2019 European Games
European Games gold medalists for Denmark
European Games bronze medalists for Denmark
European Games medalists in badminton